The Antillean Confederation was the vehement idea of Ramón Emeterio Betances about the need for natives of the Caribbean to unite into a regional entity that would seek to preserve the sovereignty and well-being of Cuba, the Dominican Republic, and Puerto Rico. Supporters of the idea wanted to free the Spanish colonies of Cuba and Puerto Rico, later uniting them with the Dominican Republic, creating a united Spanish Caribbean nation. Some proponents of the idea also supported the inclusion of Haiti and Colombia.

The idea was supported by many of the generals who fought in wars such as the Dominican War of Independence, the Dominican Restoration War, the Ten Years' War, the Little War, the Cuban War of Independence, and the Grito de Lares uprising. Support was strongest from the 1850s up until the Spanish–American War, which transferred the colonies of Cuba and Puerto Rico from Spain to the United States, since then the support for the idea largely faded away.

Its main idea was to subsequently end European colonialism in the Americas as well as a response to the Monroe doctrine phrase America for the Americans, which Betances changed to  Antilles for the Antilleans. The main gathering point of the idealists was San Felipe de Puerto Plata, Dominican Republic.

Strong supporters of this idea:
 Eugenio María de Hostos, also known as The Citizen of the Americas
 Gregorio Luperón, hero of the Dominican Restoration War
 José Martí, often referred to as The Apostle of Cuban Independence
 José de Diego
 Ramón Emeterio Betances
 Anténor Firmin

See also
 Spanish Caribbean
 History of Puerto Rico
 History of Dominican Republic
 History of Cuba
 Latin American integration
 Patria Grande

References

19th century in the Caribbean
Former Spanish colonies
Greater Antilles
History of the Dominican Republic
History of Puerto Rico
Proposed political unions
Spanish colonial period of Cuba
Spanish colonization of the Americas
Spanish West Indies